Angoisse is a commune in the Dordogne department in Nouvelle-Aquitaine in southwestern France.

Population

See also
Communes of the Dordogne department

References

External links

Official site of the commune of Angoisse in Dordogne

Communes of Dordogne
Arrondissement of Nontron